Mitrella cuspidata is a species of sea snail, a marine gastropod mollusk in the family Columbellidae, the dove snails.

Distribution
This marine species occurs off the Marquesas Islands. The holotype was found in Durban Bay, South Africa.

References

 Lussi (2009). Malacologia Mostra Mondiale 64 (3) : 20-28
 Kilburn R.N. & Marais J.P. (2010) Columbellidae. Pp. 60-104, in: Marais A.P. & Seccombe A.D. (eds), Identification guide to the seashells of South Africa. Volume 1. Groenkloof: Centre for Molluscan Studies. 376 pp
 Monsecour, K.; Monsecour, D. (2016). Deep-water Columbellidae (Mollusca: Gastropoda) from New Caledonia. in: Héros, V. et al. (Ed.) Tropical Deep-Sea Benthos 29. Mémoires du Muséum national d'Histoire naturelle (1993). 208: 291-362
 Monsecour K. & Monsecour D. (2018). Columbellidae (Mollusca: Gastropoda) from French Polynesia. Gloria Maris. 56(4): 118-151.

cuspidata
Gastropods described in 2009